Liqʼwala (also rendered  and Lik'wala), is an endangered dialect of Kwakʼwala spoken by the Laich-kwil-tach people of Vancouver Island, British Columbia.

In 2017, according to Laurie Lewis of the Liqʼwala Language Revitalization Committee, only 12 individuals, all over 70, were fluent Liqʼwala speakers. The Campbell River Mirror reported in 2017 that an attempt would be made to teach the dialect through a Liqʼwala language immersion pilot program:
Lewis says they already have a mentor-apprentice program where a fluent elder works one-on-one with a qualified teacher for 300 hours, and between that elder and teacher, she is confident they could create a three-year pilot program that would provide a full immersion program. “We just want three years to make some fluent speakers so we can save our language,” Lewis says, “and I want to have the conversation about how we can do that. We believe we can do it.”

Phonology

Orthography 

Liq'wala follows an orthography based on Americanist phonetic notation and thus varies significantly from the orthography employed by other dialects of Kwak'wala.

Revitalization efforts 
In January 2019, School District 72 Campbell River passed a motion to pilot a Liq'wala immersion program at Ripple Rock Elementary in Campbell River, BC.

References

External links 

 Liq̓ʷala interactive alphabet

Endangered Wakashan languages
First Nations languages in Canada
Indigenous languages of the Pacific Northwest Coast